"My Little Red Book" (occasionally subtitled "(All I Do Is Talk About You)") is a song composed by American songwriter Burt Bacharach with lyrics by Bacharach's songwriting partner Hal David. The duo were enlisted by Charles K. Feldman to compose the music to Woody Allen's film What's New Pussycat? following a chance meeting between Feldman and Bacharach's fiancé Angie Dickinson in London. "My Little Red Book" was composed in the time of roughly three weeks together with several other songs intended for the movie. Musically, the song was initially composed in the key of C major, largely based on a re-iterating piano riff performed. David's lyrics tells the tale of a distraught lover, who after getting dumped by his girlfriend browses through his "little red book" and taking out several girls to dance in a vain effort to get over her. 

The initial version of "My Little Red Book" was recorded by British pop group Manfred Mann due to the fact that they were signed to United Artists Records in the United States. Recorded during a session at EMI Studios in London in April 1965, the session was attended by Bacharach, who's perfectionism intimidated the band who needed to perform several re-takes of the song. Two renditions of the song were recorded, one for inclusion in What's New Pussycat and one specifically for single release. Issued through Ascot Records in the United States on May 26, 1965, "My Little Red Book" was released in place of Manfred Mann's contemporary UK single "Oh No, Not My Baby". Despite receiving good critical reception, the Manfred Mann version stalled at number 124 on the Billboard Bubbling Under Hot 100 chart.

In 1966, "My Little Red Book" once again entered mainstream popularity after American rock band Love recorded it. Love's leader Arthur Lee and guitarist Johnny Echols saw What's New Pussycat? in the cinema, and being fans of Manfred Mann, they incorporated it into their setlist. The rendition varies from Manfred Mann's in tempo along with a more "forceful rhythm". The chord progression was also changed, as Echols had forgotten several chords present in the original release. Recorded in January 1966 at Sunset Sound Recorders in Hollywood, California together with producer Jac Holzman and Mark Abramson, the song was released as Love's debut single in March, 1966 through Elektra Records. The single reached number 52 on the Billboard Hot 100, and has been considered a "standard" and archetype of garage rock.

Background and composition 
By the mid 1960s, American Burt Bacharach and Hal David were an established and respected songwriting duo, responsible for several hit singles with easy listening artists such as Dionne Warwick and Gene Pitney. In 1964, ITV Studios in the United Kingdom were interested in producing a television special about Bacharach titled The Bacharach Sound, which resulted in him flying to London with his fiancé Angie Dickinson, who was an actress knowledgable in filmmaking. At The Dorchester hotel, Dickinson ran into producer Charles K. Feldman, who was involved with Woody Allen in a new movie project, What's New Pussycat? (1965). After being shown a picture of Bacharach by Dickinson, Feldman became interested in working with him after hearing promising words about his songwriting, as Dickinson would state that "he [Bacharach] was a genius in my mind" even though she was unsure of whether he had scored film music before.

In fact, David and Bacharach were already composing music for a contemporary movie, Made in Paris (1966) and were afraid they wouldn't have time for both projects at once; this issue was solved when they had an agent hired by John Heyman, who believed What's New Pussycat? was the better deal. Allegedly, Bacharach was unaware of this meeting until he only had three weeks left to compose music for the film. "My Little Red Book" was amongst the first songs they composed for the movie, being written before the movie's title track, composed during the Easter of 1965; Dickinson states that the first songs written for the project were "My Little Red Book", "Here I Am" and "some Russian thing". As usual, David wrote the lyrics for the song while Bacharach composed the music. The song lyrically refers to a man missing his previous girlfriend, though in a vain effort to get over her, "goes from A to Z in his red book", implied to be a telephone directory or an "affectionate journal detailing girls he admired." According to Manfred Mann vocalist Paul Jones, the lyrics were some of the most clever he sang:

Manfred Mann had by this point become internationally successful, scoring a number-one hit in the US with their cover of "Do Wah Diddy Diddy" (1964). Despite their hits being rhythm and blues-oriented, Manfred Mann were largely rooted in jazz which would come in handy when Bacharach used them as a basis of the composition due to the fact that they were signed to United Artists Records in the United States; this meant Bacharach could hire them extremely cheaply. He had no previous experience in working with a pop band and had been an opposer of rock and roll during the 1950s; to spite Manfred Mann, Bacharach composed "My Little Red Book" with several unorthodox modulations and chord progressions. Composed in the key of C major, it is built on a "repeating piano line" which only changes during the chorus while it also provides the song its backbeat.

Recording 

Manfred Mann were ordered to the EMI Studio in London by United Artists after being told that "Burt, Angie and Hal" would be present there. The recording session for "My Little Red Book" was booked amidst sessions for their second album Mann Made (1965) and as a result were not paid for by Manfred Mann's British label His Master's Voice, but rather by United Artists. The session, which was held on April 27, 1965, was towards the end of the three week deadline presented to Bacharach and David, which according to Serene Dominic led to the initial version recorded during that session being "lackluster" due to the rushed nature of it. She claims it lacks anything characteristic of Manfred Mann besides "Paul Jones" edgy vocals, which meant that the version was relatively barebones. The first version recorded by the group is the one which appeared in What's New Pussycat?. On the contrary, Jones claims that the movie version was recorded after the single version of the song.

Nonetheless, a second, more refined version of the song was recorded during the same session which according to drummer Mike Hugg was due to the fact the group saw problems with the "movie version" of the song, which in his words was due to the fact that they were unable to capture an "American feel on the record. This second version of the song is thus much more refined, and features overdubbed organ, along with a "distinctive flute riff" by guitarist Mike Vickers, which mirrored the song's organ riff. Vickers additionally overdubbed saxophone on this version in order to give it more dept.

Due to Bacharach's perfectionism the band found working on the song extremely difficult. Allegedly, Jones had to re-record his vocal track about 19 times due to Bacharach being dissatisfied with several of them. Vickers also had trouble figuring out the chords for the song, while bass guitarist Tom McGuinness was the only band member to understand Bacharach's songwriting. An anectode about the song's recording is that Bacharach himself played piano on the song. According to group keyboardist Manfred Mann, the piano chords of the songs were "too strident" which meant that "Bacharach deposited himself behind the piano and pounded it and Mann to submission". In an interview with Greg Russo, Mann would elaborate that Bacharach wanted Mann to play the piano on beat "without accent" which he found too difficult; this resulted in Bacharach gradually forcing him off the piano until Bacharach stated "why don't I play it and you'll tell me if it sounds OK".

Release and reception 
In preparation and as publicity for What's New Pussycat?, Ascot Records issued "My Little Red Book" as a single on May 26, 1965 in the United States. It was release in place of Manfred Mann's contemporary UK single, "Oh No, Not My Baby", which had been a slight commercial failure, only reaching number 11 on the UK Singles Chart. The B-side of the single, "What Am I Doing Wrong", was taken from "Oh No, Not My Baby", although the US version was edited to be shorter. What's New Pussycat? debuted on June 22, 1965. "My Little Red Book" is featured in a scene set in a discotheque where actors "Peter O'Toole and Paula Prentiss shake things up". Bacharach was allegedly extremely disappointed with the movie because of the way it treated his name and his songs, focusing primarily on "My Little Red Book" as it was not a central part of the movie compared to the title track. 

"My Little Red Book" nonetheless became one of the worst performing singles during Manfred Mann's original tenure. In Billboard, the single only reached number 124 on the Bubbling Under Hot 100 chart. It fared similarly on the Cashbox Looking Ahead and Record World upcoming singles chart, reaching number 133 and 148 respectively. In Australia however, both the film and song were met with acclaim which led the single to reach number 26 on the Kent Music Report during the summer of 1965. The chart failure of the song led to His Master's Voice refusing to issue the single in the UK, where it would remain unreleased for several years afterwards. In the US, the single would be re-released on April 17, 1968 due to Manfred Mann's single "Mighty Quinn" (1968) reaching top ten; this re-issue featured the suffix "(All I Do Is Talk About You)" though it failed to chart. 

In Billboard, the single is described as having been given a "hard-driving" Chicago dance. In Cashbox magazine, the single is considered a heartbreaking ballad in a "powerpacked, pulsating blues-tinged style" and is chosen as a pick of the week. In Record World it is given a slightly satirical review, in which the panel believes "that they've found a likely candidate for sales" with the single in contrast to the moody subject matter of the song. Russo describes the song as "cool jazz rock" which never feels pretentious. According to Matthew Greenwald of AllMusic, "My Little Red Book" is one of Manfred Mann's "finer earlier tracks" and considers a prelude to the "swinging singles" which would become prevalent on the radio a few years later. The song was initially released on the soundtrack of What's New Pussycat, which was issued on May 25, 1965. It was included as the title track of Manfred Mann's third American album, My Little Red Book Of Winners! on September 13 1965.

Love version

Background 
The American rock band Love formed in Los Angeles in February 1964, originally as the American Four before changing their name to the Grass Roots in April 1965. After seeing What's New Pussycat? in theater, bandleader Arthur Lee and lead guitarist Johnny Echols decided to add "My Little Red Book" to the band's set list. During one of their performances at a local nightclub, Elektra Records president Jac Holzman saw the band, then named Love, and was impressed by their "manic intensity" on the song, feeling they had taken a "mediocre" song and given it "searing energy". He immediately offered them a recording contract, which they signed on January 4, 1966.

Recording and composition 
Love recorded "My Little Red Book" for their self-titled debut album on January 25, 1966, the second of four days dedicated to the LP. The session was held at Sunset Sound Recorders with Holzman and Mark Abramson producing, and Bruce Botnick engineering. Taped on four-track recording equipment, the song's backing track was recorded live, with Lee then overdubbing his lead and harmony vocals. Biographer John Einarson highlights the recording practices used on the track as adding to its appeal, particularly the instruments being "mixed high and loud" which gave it "a dynamic presence and immediacy." Holzman credited this to Botnick's mixing; however, he also said that the "signature Elektra approach" involved very close microphone placement to make the instruments "sound bigger."

For Love's debut album, Botnick explained that they "basically played their [live] set", a point that rhythm guitarist Bryan MacLean echoed. Although Lee liked the arrangement of Manfred Mann's version, Love had increased the song's tempo and strengthened its beat, giving it "a stomping, tambourine-fueled rhythm" (Mason).  The chord progression was also simplified into a garage rock guitar riff. Echols explained: "I forgot some of the chords after seeing the movie. When we went back and tried it at Arthur's house, I was missing certain parts, but that came to be the arrangement that we stuck with." Lee, who was a fan of Paul Jones, gave a "snarling" vocal performance which AllMusic's Stewart Mason says "seem[s] only barely to mask a suppressed fury". As well as garage rock, Love's version has been described by commentators as "garage punk", proto-punk, and hard rock by Lee himself.

Release and reception 
Love was released in March 1966, with "My Little Red Book" sequenced as the opening track. Holzman felt the song was "clearly the single" for the album, and Elektra issued it with the Lee original "A Message to Pretty" as the B-side. It reached number 1 on the LA charts and, in June, peaked at number 52 on the Billboard Hot 100 and number 35 on the Cash Box Top 100. It was the first hit record released by Elektra, and Holzman recalled pulling over to cry when he first heard it on his car radio.

Einarson writes that the song brought Love "instant acclaim" and broke them through to the wider music scene. In a contemporary review, Cash Box named the single their "Newcomer Pick" of the week, describing it as a "mighty impressive re-working" that features "an imaginative slow starting but effectively-building rhythmic style with a catchy, continuing throbbing beat." Guitarist Sterling Morrison named the song one of his favorites and said that his band the Velvet Underground would listen to it repeatedly and try "to unlock Love's sound" (Einarson). Early Pink Floyd manager Peter Jenner claimed that the song "Interstellar Overdrive" originated when he tried to hum the riff from "My Little Red Book" to Syd Barrett. Biographer Ken Brooks feels the song's influence can also be heard in the music of Iron Butterfly. Bacharach himself wrote in his 2013 memoir: "although I didn't like their version because they were playing the wrong chords, it was nice to have a hit that gave me some credibility in the world of rock and roll."

Love's version of "My Little Red Book" has since been called a standard or "classic" of garage rock. In 1989, Dave Marsh ranked it number 868 on his list of the 1,001 greatest singles of all time.

Chart Performance

Manfred Mann version

Love version

References

Sources

 

1965 songs
1965 singles
Manfred Mann songs
1966 debut singles
Love (band) songs
The Beach Boys songs
Song recordings produced by John Burgess
Song recordings produced by Jac Holzman
Songs with music by Burt Bacharach
Songs with lyrics by Hal David
Elektra Records singles